Dmytro Oleksandrovych Yefimenko (born 30 August 2001) is a Ukrainian professional footballer who plays as a right winger for Ukrainian club Uzhhorod.

References

External links
 
 
 

2001 births
Living people
Place of birth missing (living people)
Ukrainian footballers
Association football forwards
FC Dynamo Kyiv players
FC Uzhhorod players
Ukrainian First League players